The 1952 Ohio Bobcats football team was an American football team that represented Ohio University in the Mid-American Conference (MAC) during the 1952 college football season. In their fourth season under head coach Carroll Widdoes, the Bobcats compiled a 6–2–1 record (5–2 against MAC opponents), finished in third place in the MAC, and outscored all opponents by a combined total of 180 to 133.  They played their home games in Peden Stadium in Athens, Ohio.

The team's statistical leaders included Dick Phillips with 345 rushing yards, Bill Frederick with 845 passing yards, and Lou Sawchik with 472 receiving yards. Center Vince Costello was named to the Little All-America Team.

Schedule

References

Ohio
Ohio Bobcats football seasons
Ohio Bobcats football